Lachapet is a village located in the Dubbak mandal, Medak district, Telangana. As of 2011 census, the population was around 5,000.

References

Villages in Medak district